The Pill Awards are an annual awards ceremony held in New York City.  Organized by Public-access television cable TV television show ADD-TV, the awards honor artists in the LGBT community and are the brain child of cinematographer and editor George Lyter.

Selected winners

References

External links
 Z Lounge TV coverage of 2010 Pill Awards

LGBT-related awards